Christine Barbier (born 1992) is a Seychellois model and beauty pageant title holder who was crowned winner of Miss Seychelles 2016.

Life
Barbier was born in the Cascade administrative district of Mahé. She is an alumna of the Seychelles Tourism Academy where she studied tourism and tour guiding. She works as an accounts assistant at Mason's Exchange in Victoria.

Pageantry

Miss Seychelles 2016
Barbier contested at the 2016 edition of Miss Seychelles and was crowned winner of the competition on 28 May 2016 at the International Conference Centre of Seychelles. She represented Seychelles at Miss World 2016 in the United States.

References

1992 births
Living people
Seychellois beauty pageant winners
People from Cascade, Seychelles
Miss World 2016 delegates